Quadruple may refer to:

 4-tuple, an ordered list of elements, with four elements
 Quad (figure skating), a figure skating jump
 Quadruple (computing), a term used as alternative for nibble in some contexts
 Quadruple-precision floating-point format in computing
 Multiple birth with four offspring
 A term for winning four football trophies in a single season

See also
 4 (disambiguation)
 Quadruple Alliance (disambiguation), any of a number of military alliances
 Quadrupel, a strong beer
 Quadripole
 Quadrupole